The 1980 Commonwealth Final was the second running of the Commonwealth Final as part of the qualification for the 1980 Speedway World Championship Final to be held at the Ullevi Stadium in Göteborg, Sweden. The 1980 Final was run on 29 June at the Wimbledon Stadium in London, England, and was part of the World Championship qualifying for riders from the Commonwealth nations.

1980 Commonwealth Final
29 June
 Wimbledon Stadium, London 
Qualification: Top 9 plus 1 reserve to the Intercontinental Final in London

References

See also
 Motorcycle Speedway

1980
Commonwealth Final
Commonwealth Final
Commonwealth Final
Commonwealth Final
Commonwealth Final